Mahmood Rasheed (born 22 June 1955) is a former Pakistani cricketer and cricket umpire who played 87 First-class and 40 List A games.

Umpiring career
Rasheed umpired in one T20I during the 2007 ACC Twenty20 Cup. The match was between Singapore and Hong Kong.

References

External links
 

1955 births
Living people
Pakistani cricketers
Cricketers from Karachi
Karachi cricketers
United Bank Limited cricketers